The Northern Ireland Region of Shopping Centres (NIRSC) was founded in 1989 to promote the shopping centre industry as an integral part of the community in Northern Ireland. It continues to function today.

The group is also responsible for offering contacts and communications between the two dozen shopping centres that operate in the province. Its board and membership are made up of many managers and operators of Ulster's largest shopping centres.

The group's website also operates as an information hub for activities across Northern Ireland as well as offering several interactive features and listings of all shopping complexes in the province.

The 2004 Awards

In 2004 the group held an award ceremony to award the best in the industry. The following awards were given,.

 Best facilities & Customer service - Forestside Shopping Centre
 Best Community investment - Connswater Shopping Centre
 Best refurbishment/Expansion - Abbey Centre
 Best car park - Flagship
 Best advertising campaign - Forestside Shopping Centre/ The Quays
 Best overall marketing for a shopping centre - Connswater Shopping Centre
 Best retailer in a shopping centre - New Look
 Shopping centre manager of the year -  Michael O'Hagan
 Best shopping centre - Foyleside
 Outstanding Service to the Shopping Centre Industry - Kevin Milhench
 Best Event - Park Centre

External links
 NIRSC Site

References